The Federal University of Fronteira Sul (UFFS) is a public, federally-funded Brazilian university serving the interior of Southern Brazil.  It was formally founded by act of legislature in September 2009, and planned to graduate 10,000 students within its first five years.

Its headquarters and main campus are in Chapecó, Santa Catarina, and smaller campuses are located in Laranjeiras do Sul and Realeza in Paraná, and Cerro Largo, Erechim, and Passo Fundo in Rio Grande do Sul. Its current rector is Marcelo Rectenvald, appointed in 2019 for a four-year term.

In 2019, the university enrolled 7,792 students in 42 programs, and was ranked by Folha de S.Paulo 114th nationally.

Notes

External links

  

Fronteira Sul
Education in Santa Catarina (state)